Apollonia Museum (also known as Susa Museum) is an archaeological museum located in Susa, Libya. Its collection includes ancient Libyan and Ptolemaic sculptures, funerary art, architectural elements, ceramics, and other household items. The museum houses a lot of history that includes Greek and Latin artifacts.

History 
As a harbor for the city of Cyrene, Apollonia was created in the seventh century. The Greek sun god Apollo is the source of the name Apollonia. The Apollonia Museum is home to a large collection of sculptures, busts, heads, columns, ceramics, and other domestic artifacts discovered in the area.

See also 

 List of museums in Libya
 Treasury of Cyrene

References 

Museums with year of establishment missing
Jabal al Akhdar
Archaeological museums in Libya